Praecox is a Latin term meaning "very early". It is often used as a qualifying adjective in Latin binomials, and could mean "early flowering", "primitive", "premature" or "early onset" (in the case of medical conditions).

Plants

Agapanthus praecox, a South African bulbous plant
Aira praecox, a European grass 
Allium praecox, a Californian onion
Casearia praecox, a West Indian tree
Chimonanthus praecox, wintersweet, a Chinese shrub
Clematis 'Praecox', a flowering shrub cultivar
Cytisus × praecox, a spring-flowering shrub
Hydrangea paniculata 'Praecox', a flowering shrub cultivar
Lindera praecox, an Asian shrub
Medicago praecox, a Mediterranean plant in the pea family
Pittocaulon praecox, a Mexican shrub in the daisy family
Pleione praecox, an Asian orchid
Rhododendron 'Praecox', a flowering shrub cultivar
Roscoea praecox, a Chinese perennial in the ginger family
Stachyurus praecox, a shrub from Japan
Thymus praecox, a European thyme
Weigela praecox, a shrub from Russia

Fungi
Agrocybe praecox, a Northern Hemisphere mushroom
Gymnopilus praecox, a North American mushroom

Animals
Actebia praecox, the Portland moth
Ceratotherium praecox, an extinct rhinoceros
Denticetopsis praecox, a South American fish
Deroceras praecox, an east European slug
Iotabrycon, an Ecuadorean fish
Melanotaenia praecox, a rainbow fish from West Papua 
Mordacia praecox, a lamprey (primitive fish) from Australia
Thamnophilus praecox, the Cocha antshrike, a bird from Ecuador
Persia praecox, a trilobite from Iran

Medical conditions
Dementia praecox, a degenerative disease of late puberty and early adulthood
Ejaculatio praecox, premature ejaculation in human males
Lymphedema praecox, a swelling of the lymph nodes
Pubertas praecox, premature puberty in humans